Paulo Cézar Magalhães Lobos (born 14 December 1989) is a Chilean footballer who plays as a full-back for Chilean Primera División club Deportes Antofagasta.

Early life
Magalhães was born in Porto Alegre, Brazil to a Brazilian father, former footballer Osmar Magalhães, who had previously played in Chile for Deportes Antofagasta where met his mother, Ximena Lobos, who is Chilean.

Club career

Deportes Antofagasta
Magalhães began in the youth system of Chilean club Deportes Antofagasta. He played on the under 17 and under 19 sides in 2006 and 2007 respectively. In 2006, he made his debut with the adult side under coach Fernando Diaz.

Cobreloa
Magalhães signed for Cobreloa on a one-year contract in June 2008.  He scored his first professional goal on May 2, 2009, against the next club he would sign with, Colo-Colo.

Colo-Colo
Before the 2009 Clausura Tournament, Colo-Colo lost starting defender Luis Pedro Figueroa. In order to fill the void, Colo-Colo signed Magalhães to a one-year contract. He played regularly in his first tournament with the team and scored two goals and the team went on to win the 2009 Clausura Championship.

National team
Magalhães has participated on several different levels with the Chile national team. In 2008, he was part of the Chile Sub-18 side that won the João Havelange tournament which was held in Mexico.

After showing good form in Antofagasta in 2007 and with Cobreloa at the beginning of 2008, Magalhães was named to the Sub-23 national side coached by Eduardo Berizzo. The tournament which took place in Kuala Lumpur, Malaysia, saw he scored one goal against Togo. The same year Magalhaes participated in the Milk Cup, in which Chile took a sub-19 team.  Chile made it to the final losing to Northern Ireland 2-1.

In 2009, Magalhães was part of the sub-20 Chile team in the 2009 South American Youth Championship held in Venezuela, which was unable to surpass the group stage. In the same year, he again participated in an international tournament with the Sub-21 Chilean side in the 2009 Toulon Tournament. Finally Magalhães won an international tournament when the team was crowned champions.  His good performance in the tournament caused him to sign with Chilean side Colo-Colo.

Honours

Club
Colo-Colo
Primera División de Chile (1): 2009 Clausura

Universidad de Chile
Primera División de Chile (3): 2011 Clausura, 2012 Apertura, 2014 Apertura
Copa Sudamericana (1): 2011
Copa Chile (2): 2012–13, 2015
Supercopa de Chile (1): 2015

Internacional
 Campeonato Gaúcho (1): 2016

International
Chile U18
 João Havelange Tournament (1): 2008

Chile U21
Toulon Tournament (1): 2009

Personal life
From his paternal line – son of the Brazilian former professional footballer Osmar Magalhães "Bozzo" – he is the nephew of Paulo César, a former footballer who won the 1983 Copa Libertadores and the 1983 Intercontinental Cup along with Grêmio and that worked as his agent. Also, he is the cousin of Rafael Magalhães and Thiago Pereira.

References

External links

1989 births
Living people
Footballers from Porto Alegre
Brazilian emigrants to Chile
Naturalized citizens of Chile
Citizens of Chile through descent
Chilean people of Brazilian descent
Chilean footballers
Chilean expatriate footballers
Chile international footballers
Chile under-20 international footballers
Chile youth international footballers
C.D. Antofagasta footballers
FC Locarno players
Cobreloa footballers
Colo-Colo footballers
Universidad de Chile footballers
Sport Club Internacional players
Criciúma Esporte Clube players
O'Higgins F.C. footballers
Chilean Primera División players
Swiss Challenge League players
Campeonato Brasileiro Série A players
Campeonato Brasileiro Série B players
Expatriate footballers in Switzerland
Chilean expatriate sportspeople in Switzerland
Expatriate footballers in Brazil
Chilean expatriate sportspeople in Brazil
Association football fullbacks
People from Porto Alegre